Climate endgame is the name some scientists have given to the hypothesis of a global societal collapse due to effects of climate change. The real chance of happening is considered small, but the researchers who warned most resoundingly about this danger in August 2022 seek to improve risk management by putting a higher priority on worst-case scenarios, to "galvanise action, improve resilience, and inform policy". These experts belong to the Centre for the Study of Existential Risk, a research centre at the University of Cambridge.

The collapse would come through a set of interrelated concurrent factors such as famine (crop loss, drought), extreme weather (hurricanes, floods), war (caused by the scarce resources) and conflict, systemic risk (relating to migration, famine, or conflict), and disease.

The team of international experts led by Cambridge University also warn about tipping points: small rises in global temperature which result in big changes in the climate. These tipping points could trigger others in a cascade (domino effect), in a non-linear way, which makes their effects hard to estimate. Unintended consequences (knock-on effects) could also unleash. These findings were published in the journal Proceedings of the National Academy of Sciences.

The study found the risk to be a "dangerously underexplored" global topic, despite and "integrated catastrophe assessment" to be missing.

Other scientists had previously warned about this hypothesis, but may have found less echo. For example, the fifth assessment of the Intergovernmental Panel on Climate Change (April 2021), or John van der Velden and Rob White in their book The Extinction Curve (January 2021). The concept had been previously named climate apocalypse.

See also 
 Climate change mitigation
 Climate crisis
 Climate emergency declaration
 Eco-anxiety
 Global catastrophic risk
 Solastalgia

References 

Climate change
Climate change and society
Existential risk
Human extinction
Environmental social science
Risk
Effects of climate change
Societal collapse